The Veveno River is a river in eastern South Sudan by the Imatong Mountains. It is a tributary of the Lotilla River, which it joins southwest of Pibor.

See also
 List of rivers of South Sudan

External links
Map of Veveno, Sudan

Rivers of South Sudan
Jonglei State
Geography of Eastern Equatoria
Greater Upper Nile